Thor & Loki: Blood Brothers is a four episode motion comic from Marvel Knights Animation released in April 2011. It is based on the 2004 miniseries Loki by Robert Rodi and Esad Ribic.

A DVD containing all four episodes was released on September 13, 2011, from Shout! Factory.

Plot
Loki has become the ruler of Asgard. However, he does not have dominion over Hela, the goddess of death. Loki is demanding fealty from everyone in Asgard. Hela asks Loki for the soul of Thor for her "legions in Nifelheim". Goddess Sif is imprisoned at the ending of the first segment.

Karnilla, the queen god of Nornheim meets Loki in the second segment. She pleads for the release of Balder from imprisonment. In the third segment, Loki orders the destruction of the Rainbow Bridge. In a flashback, Odin defeats Laufey in battle.

In the final segment, Loki refuses to execute Thor and spurns Hela.

Voice cast
According to producer Ruwan Jayatilleke, the voice cast was drawn from the Broadway theater, but under pseudonyms. Nevertheless, the credited cast is:

 David Blair as Loki, god of tricks who has become the ruler of Asgard
 Barney Townsend as Young Loki
 Daniel Thorn as Thor, god of thunder
 Katharine Chesterton as Hela, goddess of death
 Ziggy McShane as Daia, concubine
 Serena Merriman as Farbauti of Jotunheim
 Phoebe Stewart as Karnilla
 Deborah Jane McKinely as Frigga, Lorelei
 Elizabeth Diennet as Sif
 Joe Teiger as Odin
 James Hampshire as Balder
 Rich Orlov as Warden
 Heimdall, guardian of the rainbow bridge

References

External links
 MARVEL TV: Thor & Loki: Blood Brothers official website

Marvel Animation
Thor (Marvel Comics) in other media
Adult animated television shows based on Marvel Comics
2010s American adult animated television series
American adult animated superhero television series